Thomas Biamore Bruton (born August 30, 1930) was a major general in the United States Air Force. He was the United States Air Force Judge Advocate General from 1980 to 1985. Born in Texas and raised in Colorado, he graduated from Colorado Springs High School in 1947. Bruton holds a B.S. degree in business from the University of Colorado Boulder, a law degree from the University of Colorado Law School (1954) and master's degrees from George Washington University (1966) and Auburn University (1971). General Bruton is also a graduate of the Air Command and Staff College (1965) and the Air War College (1971), both located at Maxwell Air Force Base, Ala.

Bruton is the son of Lausane Thomas Bruton (1902–1981) and Helen G. (Cowgill) Bruton (1908–2001).

Military awards

References

1930 births
Living people
People from Weslaco, Texas
University of Colorado Boulder alumni
University of Colorado Law School alumni
Military personnel from Colorado
George Washington University School of Business alumni
Air Command and Staff College alumni
Auburn University alumni
Air War College alumni
Recipients of the Meritorious Service Medal (United States)
Recipients of the Legion of Merit
United States Air Force generals
Judge Advocates General of the United States Air Force